Evangelos Patras (Greek: Βαγγέλης Πάτρας; born 17 October 1968, Agria) is a Greek former water polo player who competed in the 1988 Summer Olympics, in the 1992 Summer Olympics, and in the 1996 Summer Olympics.

Personal
His daughter Maria is an international waterpolo player.

Honours
 Greek Championship: 1988, 1994
 Greek Cup: 1988, 1991

See also
 Greece men's Olympic water polo team records and statistics
 List of men's Olympic water polo tournament goalkeepers

References

External links
 

1968 births
Living people
Greek male water polo players
Water polo goalkeepers
Olympic water polo players of Greece
Panathinaikos Water Polo Club players
Water polo players at the 1988 Summer Olympics
Water polo players at the 1992 Summer Olympics
Water polo players at the 1996 Summer Olympics
People from Agria
Ethnikos Piraeus Water Polo Club players
Sportspeople from Thessaly
20th-century Greek people